Incisor Ridge is a ridge,  long, forming the southwestern segment of Molar Massif in the Bowers Mountains of Antarctica. It was named in association with Molar Massif by the New Zealand Antarctic Place-Names Committee in 1983 on the proposal of geologist M.G. Laird. The topographical feature lies situated on the Pennell Coast, a portion of Antarctica lying between Cape Williams and Cape Adare.

References

Ridges of Victoria Land
Pennell Coast